You Can't Do That on Stage Anymore, Vol. 4 is a two-CD set of live recordings by Frank Zappa, recorded between 1969 and 1988, and released in 1991.

Track listing 
All tracks written by Frank Zappa, except where noted.

Personnel

Musicians 
 Frank Zappa – vocals on tracks 1-1, 1-2, 1-4 to 1-6, 1-8, 1-9, 2-4 to 2-7, 2-8 (sensitive vocal), 2-10 to 2-12, 2-16, and 2-18; lead guitar on tracks 1-4, 1-5, 1-7, 1-10 to 1-16, 2-1 (1st solo), 2-2, 2-3, 2-6, 2-07, 2-10, and 2-11
 Ray White – guitar on tracks 1-2, 1-4 to 1-9, 1-13, 2-1 to 2-6, 2-11, 2-16, and 2-18; vocals on tracks 1-2, 1-4 to 1-9, 2-1 to 2-6, 2-11, 2-16, and 2-18
 Ike Willis – guitar on tracks 1-2, 1-4 to 1-7, 1-9, 1-10, 1-13, 1-15, 2-3, 2-6, 2-11, and 2-16; vocals on tracks 1-2, 1-4 to 1-7, 1-9, 1-14, 2-3, 2-6, 2-7, 2-11, and 2-16
 Steve Vai – guitar on tracks 1-8, 2-1 (2nd solo), 2-2, 2-4, 2-5, and 2-18
 Lowell George – guitar on tracks 1-11, 2-8, and 2-12; vocals on tracks 2-8, and 2-12
 Mike Keneally – guitar on tracks 1-14, and 1-15
 Warren Cuccurullo – guitar on track 2-7
 Denny Walley – slide guitar on tracks 1-12, 1-16, and 2-7; vocals on tracks 1-1, and 2-7
 Bobby Martin – keyboards on tracks 1-2, 1-4 to 1-8, 1-10, 1-13 to 1-15, 2-1 to 2-6, 2-11, 2-16, and 2-18; saxophone on tracks 1-2, 1-4 to 1-8, 1-10, 1-13, 2-1 to 2-6, 2-11, 2-16, and 2-18; vocals on tracks 1-2, 1-4 to 1-8, 2-2 to 2-6, 2-11, 2-16, and 2-18
 Allan Zavod – keyboards on tracks 1-2, 1-4 to 1-7, 1-10, 1-13, 2-3, 2-6, 2-11, and 2-16
 Tommy Mars – keyboards on tracks 1-1, 1-8, 1-9, 1-12, 2-1, 2-2, 2-4, 2-5, 2-7, and 2-18; vocals on tracks 1-8, 1-12 (2nd solo), 2-1, 2-2, 2-4, 2-5, 2-7, and 2-18
 Don Preston – keyboards on tracks 1-11, 2-8, and 2-12
 George Duke – keyboards on tracks 1-5, 1-16, and 2-10; vocals on tracks 1-5, and 2-10
 Peter Wolf – keyboards on tracks  1-1, and Minimoog solo on track 1-12
 Mike Keneally – synthesizer on tracks 1-14, and 1-15
 Don Preston – synthesizer on tracks 2-8, and 2-12
 Scott Thunes – bass on tracks 1-2, 1-4 to 1-8, 1-10, 1-13 to 1-15, 2-1 to 2-6, 2-11, 2-16, and 2-18
 Arthur Barrow – bass on tracks 1-1, 1-9, 1-12, and 2-7
 Roy Estrada – bass on tracks 1-11, 2-8, and 2-12; vocals on tracks 1-11, 2-8, and 2-12; keyboards on track 1-9
 Tom Fowler – bass on tracks 1-5, 1-16, and 2-10
 Patrick O'Hearn – bass on tracks 1-1, and 1-12; vocals on track 1-1
 Chad Wackerman – drums on tracks 1-2, 1-4 to 1-8, 1-10, 1-13 to 1-15, 2-1 to 2-6, 2-11, 2-16, and 2-18
 Arthur Dyer Tripp III – drums on tracks 1-11, 2-8, and 2-12
 Vinnie Colaiuta – drums on tracks 1-1, 1-12, and 2-7
 Jimmy Carl Black – drums on tracks 1-11, 2-8, and 2-12
 Chester Thompson – drums on tracks 1-5, and 2-10
 Ralph Humphrey – drums on track 1-5
 David Logeman – drums on track 1-9
 Terry Bozzio – drums on track 1-16
 Captain Beefheart – harmonica and vocals on track 1-16
 Ian Underwood – alto saxophone on tracks 2-8, and 2-12; clarinet on track 1-11
 Paul Carman – alto saxophone on tracks 1-14, and 1-15
 Napoleon Murphy Brock – saxophone on tracks 1-5, 1-16, and 2-10; vocals on tracks 1-5, and 2-10
 Bunk Gardner – tenor saxophone on tracks 1-11, 2-8, and 2-12
 Albert Wing – tenor saxophone on tracks 1-14, and 1-15
 Archie Shepp – tenor saxophone solo on track 1-10
 Kurt McGettrick – baritone saxophone on tracks 1-14, and 1-15
 Motorhead Sherwood – baritone saxophone on tracks 1-11, 2-8, and 2-12
 Buzz Gardner – trumpet on tracks 1-11, 2-8, and 2-12
 Walt Fowler – trumpet on tracks 1-14, and 1-15; vocals on track 1-14
 Bruce Fowler – trombone on tracks 1-5, and 1-14 to 1-16
 Ed Mann – percussion on tracks 1-1, 1-8, 1-12, 1-14, 1-15, 2-1, 2-2, 2-4, 2-5, 2-7, and 2-18
 Ruth Underwood – percussion on tracks 1-5, and 2-10
 Dave Samuels – percussion soloist on vibes on track 1-11

Production 
 Frank Zappa – producer, liner notes, editing
 Bob Stone – remix engineer, and engineering supervision
 Kathleen Philpott – package design

References

External links 
 Lyrics and information
 Release details

Live at the Fillmore East albums
Frank Zappa live albums
1991 live albums
Rykodisc live albums
Albums produced by Frank Zappa
Sequel albums